Adolf Frey (18 February 1855, Küttigen – 12 February 1920, Zurich) was a Swiss writer and literary historian. He was nominated for the Nobel Prize in Literature seven times.

Life 
The son of popular writer Jakob Frey (1824–1875), he studied at various universities, including from 1879 to 1881 literature and history at the University of Leipzig.

In 1882 he became a German teacher at the high school in Aarau and in 1898 professor of German literature at the University of Zurich. He died six days before his 65th birthday, from cancer.

Works
 Schweizersagen, Leipzig 1881
 Erinnerungen an Gottfried Keller, 1892
 Conrad Ferdinand Meyer, sein Leben und seine Werke, 1900
 Aus versunkenen Gärten

References

External links

Swiss writers
German-language writers
1855 births
1920 deaths